Utegi is a town in northern Tanzania.

References

Populated places in Mara Region